"Raised on Country" is a song recorded by American country music artist Chris Young. It was released on January 28, 2019, as the first single from Young's seventh studio album Famous Friends. It was originally intended to be the title track, but the album's release was delayed due to the COVID-19 pandemic, leading to it being retitled to Famous Friends. Young co-wrote the track with Corey Crowder and Cary Barlowe.

Commercial performance
The song has sold 68,000 copies in the United States as of September 2019.

Music video
The music video for "Raised on Country" was directed by Peter Zavadil and premiered on March 15, 2019. It shows Young and his band going into a recording studio to record the song, while the tension and pulses from the song create a strange windstorm all over Nashville and around Young and his band. The city of Nashville also seems to be "pouncing" along to the loud beats of the song. It was filmed at the 650 AM WSM studios inside the Gaylord Opryland Resort & Convention Center.

Charts

Weekly charts

Year-end charts

Certifications

References

2019 songs
2019 singles
Chris Young (musician) songs
RCA Records Nashville singles
Songs written by Chris Young (musician)
Songs written by Cary Barlowe
Songs written by Corey Crowder (songwriter)